"Killer" is the debut solo single released by British hip hop producer and rapper Fazer, also known for his work with the hip hop trio N-Dubz. "Killer" was taken as the lead single from his untitled debut studio album. The single was released on August 26, 2012, peaking at number 17 on the UK Singles Chart. He became the only member from N-Dubz not to score a number one single with his first solo hit.

Track listing

Music video
The music video for the track was directed by Jack Fresh, although the concept for the video was written by Fazer. The video depicts Fazer being kidnapped by a group of girls, and then detained in a cell. He then goes wild whilst trying to free himself from a straitjacket.

Charts

Release history

References

2012 singles
Dubstep songs
2012 songs
All Around the World Productions singles
Songs written by Peter Kelleher (songwriter)
Songs written by Tom Barnes (songwriter)
Songs written by Ben Kohn
Songs written by Richard Rawson